Tyler Brooke (born Victor Hugo de Bierre,  June 6, 1886 – March 2, 1943) was an American film actor. He appeared in more than 90 films between 1915 and 1943. He was born in New York, New York and died in Los Angeles, California by committing suicide by carbon monoxide poisoning.

Before he became an entertainer, Brooke was a bank clerk and an attorney.

He began on the stage at the Globe Theatre, New York City in 1912. He went to Los Angeles in 1925 with No, No, Nanette as a comedian and was captured for screen. He worked for Hal Roach for a year and a half before going into other films.

In 1929, he sued Oliver Hardy for $109,570 damages, alleging that Hardy struck him across the arm with a billiard cue, fracturing it and preventing him working for 12 weeks.

Partial filmography

 Frozen Hearts (1923, Short)
 Wandering Papas (1926, Short) - Onion, a Bridge Engineer
 Madame Mystery (1926, Short) - Hungry Artist
 Along Came Auntie (1926, Short) - The Under-Sheriff
 Crazy Like a Fox (1926, Short)
 On the Front Page (1926, Short) - Young Hornby
 Stage Madness (1927) - H.H. Bragg
 Two-Time Mama (1927, Short) - Mr. Dazzle aka The Devil
 The Honorable Mr. Buggs (1927, Short)
 Rich But Honest (1927) - Barney Zoom
 Cradle Snatchers (1927) - Osteopath
 Fazil (1928) - Jacques Dubreuze
 None but the Brave (1928) - Hotel Clerk
 The Bees' Buzz (1929, Short) - Tyler Smith - Peggy's Suitor
 Dynamite (1929) - The Life of the Party
 Lilies of the Field (1930) - Bert Miller
 The Furies (1930) - Smith
 The Divorcee (1930) - Hank
 Monte Carlo (1930) - Armand
 Madam Satan (1930) - Romeo
 Playboy of Paris (1930) - Cadeaux
 New Moon (1930) - Gossipy Passenger on Ship (uncredited)
 Sweepstakes (1931) - Master of Ceremonies (uncredited)
 The Magnificent Lie (1931) - Pierre LeCoeur
 A Dangerous Affair (1931) - Harvey
 Million Dollar Legs (1932) - Olympics Announcer (uncredited)
 Love Me Tonight (1932) - Composer (uncredited)
 Trouble in Paradise (1932) - Commercial Singer (uncredited)
 Hallelujah, I'm a Bum (1933) - Mayor's Secretary
 Child of Manhattan (1933) - Dulcey (uncredited)
 Don't Bet on Love (1933) - Minor Role (uncredited)
 Morning Glory (1933) - Charles Van Duesen
 My Lips Betray (1933) - Radio Announcer (uncredited)
 Blind Date (1934) - Emory
 Belle of the Nineties (1934) - Comedian
 The Merry Widow (1934) - Escort (uncredited)
 Imitation of Life (1934) - Tipsy Man at Party (uncredited)
 365 Nights in Hollywood (1934) - Casting Director (uncredited)
 Mrs. Wiggs of the Cabbage Patch (1934)
 Night Life of the Gods (1935) - Store Manager (uncredited)
 Times Square Lady (1935) - Casa Nova Bandmaster (uncredited)
 Call of the Wild (1935) - Jim, Man on Stage with Show Girls (uncredited)
 Here Comes the Band (1935) - Dentist
 It's in the Air (1935) - Hotel Clerk (uncredited)
 Next Time We Love (1936) - Author (uncredited)
 Poor Little Rich Girl (1936) - Dan Ward
 Suzy (1936) - Raoul (uncredited)
 To Mary – with Love (1936) - Guest
 In His Steps (1936) - (uncredited)
 Two in a Crowd (1936) - Charles Brock (uncredited)
 All American Chump (1936) - Andrews (uncredited)
 This Is My Affair (1937) - Specialty
 You Can't Have Everything (1937) - Hotel Clerk (uncredited)
 In Old Chicago (1938) - Speciality Singer
 Bluebeard's Eighth Wife (1938) - Clerk
 Alexander's Ragtime Band (1938) - Assistant Stage Manager (uncredited)
 Tom Sawyer, Detective (1938) - Store Clerk (uncredited)
 Pacific Liner (1939) - Ship Steward (uncredited)
 The Story of Alexander Graham Bell (1939) - Mr. Calhoun (uncredited)
 The Wizard of Oz (1939) - Emerald City citizen (uncredited)
 Little Old New York (1940) - Singer
 One Night in the Tropics (1940) - First Man Polled by Jim (uncredited)
 Street of Memories (1940) - Barbershop Manager (uncredited)
 Tin Pan Alley (1940) - Bert Melville
 Kitty Foyle (1940) - Husband in Prologue (uncredited)
 Lydia (1941) - Vaudeville Singer (uncredited)
 Two Latins from Manhattan (1941) - Hotel Clerk (uncredited)
 I Married an Angel (1942) - Lucien (uncredited)
 Lucky Legs (1942) - Jenkins (uncredited)
 The McGuerins from Brooklyn (1942) - Spa Desk Clerk (uncredited)
 She Has What It Takes (1943) - Stage Manager (uncredited)

References

External links

1886 births
1943 suicides
American male film actors
American male silent film actors
Suicides by carbon monoxide poisoning
Suicides in California
20th-century American male actors
Burials at Valhalla Memorial Park Cemetery
Metro-Goldwyn-Mayer contract players